Juraj Benčík (born 15 February 1945) is a Slovak racewalker. He competed in the men's 20 kilometres walk at the 1980 Summer Olympics.

References

1945 births
Living people
Athletes (track and field) at the 1980 Summer Olympics
Slovak male racewalkers
Olympic athletes of Czechoslovakia
Place of birth missing (living people)